Rhododendron hirsutum, commonly known as the hairy alpenrose is one of the species of Rhododendron native to the mountains of Europe. It occurs widely in the Alps except for the southwestern region (approximately south and west of the Matterhorn), and has become naturalised in parts of the Carpathians. It grows on carbonate-rich soils, whereas its close relative R. ferrugineum grows on acid soils; where the two occur together, they frequently produce the hybrid Rhododendron × intermedium.

References

External links

hirsutum
Alpine flora
Plants described in 1753
Taxa named by Carl Linnaeus